The Price of Being a Rose is Loneliness is the fourth album by Japanese rock band D'erlanger, released on April 30, 2008. It reached number 22 on the Oricon chart. The limited edition had a different cover and came with a DVD of music videos for "Zakuro" and "XXX for You" (from their previous album Lazzaro), and the making of "Zakuro".

Track listing
 "Eloa"
 
 "Taboo"
 "Public Poison #9"
 "Parfum de L'avidite'"
 "Opium"
 "Dancin'g with Lilly"
 "Blanc -Cheres Roses-"
 "Blanc -Cheres Douleur-"
 "Maria"
 
 "Amaoto"
 "Elod - Symphony 4 Incarnation of Eroticism"

References

2008 albums
D'erlanger albums